During President Jimmy Carter's term in office, no vacancy occurred on the Supreme Court of the United States. He thus became the first president since Andrew Johnson and the fourth president overall (after William Henry Harrison, Zachary Taylor and Johnson) to complete his term without making any appointments to the Supreme Court. Because these other presidents either died in office or assumed the presidency because of an intra-term vacancy, Carter is the only US president  to serve a single full term without getting to appoint a Justice.

Politics
As president, Carter actively sought to burnish his standing among women's rights groups by using the power of appointment provided by his office. By the end of his term, Carter had appointed forty-one of the forty-six women serving as federal judges and three of the six women ever to have served as full Cabinet members. One of these Cabinet members was Shirley Hufstedler, who in 1979 resigned her seat on Court of Appeals for the Ninth Circuit to serve as head of the newly created Department of Education. According to White House officials, Hufstedler received assurances that accepting the Cabinet position would not preclude her from being nominated to the Supreme Court.

Names mentioned

Following is a list of individuals who were mentioned in various news accounts and books as having been considered by Carter for a Supreme Court appointment:

Executive Branch officials
 Shirley Hufstedler (1925-2016) – United States Secretary of Education; former Judge, Court of Appeals for the Ninth Circuit

Other backgrounds
 Charles H. Kirbo (1917-1996) – Private attorney

See also
 United States federal judge
 Judicial appointment history for United States federal courts

References

United States Supreme Court candidates by president
Supreme Court candidates